The 1957 Columbia Lions football team was an American football team that represented Columbia University as a member of the Ivy League during the 1957 NCAA University Division football season. 

In their first season under head coach Aldo "Buff" Donelli, the Lions compiled a 1–8 record and were outscored 214 to 54. George Pappas was the team captain.  

The Lions' 1–6 conference record finished last in the Ivy League. Columbia was outscored 148 to 41 by Ivy opponents. 

Columbia played its home games at Baker Field in Upper Manhattan, in New York City.

Schedule

References

Columbia
Columbia Lions football seasons
Columbia Lions football